"They Only Come Out at Night" is the fourth single from Lordi's third album, The Arockalypse, and is one of the band's five singles that has not been made into a music video (along with "My Heaven is Your Hell", "Beast Loose in Paradise", "Deadache", and "Rock Police").

Overview
Udo Dirkschneider guest stars in the song. Although a promo version was released by Lordi's German record label, Drakkar Entertainment, it hasn't appeared in stores. Instead, the promo single was handed out at some events in Germany in February 2006. The B-side of the Finnish version is a cover of the Accept song, "Midnight Mover", which was recorded in 2003 in a radio studio during a live broadcast. The song charted at number six in Finland.

Track lists
Finnish edition
 "They Only Come Out at Night" (featuring Udo Dirkschneider) – 3:37
 "Midnight Mover (live)" – 3:26

German promo version
 "They Only Come Out at Night"
 "Supermonstars"

References

2007 singles
Lordi songs
2006 songs
Sony BMG singles